A chiva (Spanish for goat) or escalera (Spanish for ladder and stairs) is an artisan rustic  bus used in rural Colombia.  Chivas are adapted to rural public transport, especially considering the mountainous geography of the Andean region of these countries.

The buses are varied and characterized by being painted colorfully (usually with the yellow, blue, and red colors of the flags of Colombia, Venezuela and Ecuador) with local arabesques and figures. Most have a ladder to the rack on the roof which is also used for carrying people, livestock and merchandise.

They are built upon a bus chassis with a modified body made out either metal or wood. Seats are benchlike, made out of wood and with doors instead of windows. The owner or driver usually gives the vehicle a unique nickname.

In Panama, the term Chiva is used to describe a Toyota Coaster or another similar bus operating in a manner similar to a Chicken bus. Unlike Chicken buses, Chivas are often painted white.

History
Chivas were first introduced in the Antioquia Department in the early 20th century. Peasants of the region usually relied on horse-drawn vehicles for the transportation of goods and themselves. In 1908 Colombian engineer Luciano Restrepo and Colombian mechanic Roberto Tisnes imported a chassis from the United States. In Medellin they built the first body. This first bus was used in a route between downtown Medellin to the town of El Poblado. The first models were very basic, with a canvas-made roof and four benches. The body of newer models were modified with a roof rack so peasants could transport their goods.

There is no official account of when this kind of bus first arrived in western Antioquia. In the book 'Memories of my land' (Memorias de mi tierra), Colombian writer Alirio Diaz tells about the first vehicles ever to arrive in Antioquia through the Las Palmas Road. The most reliable account is found in the book 'Notes for the History of San Vicente' (Apuntes para la Historia de San Vicente) where Colombian author Ricardo Zuluaga Gil narrates the arrival of the first chiva:

The term escalera (ladder) was coined because the buses have a ladder, usually located on the rear of the bus. This ladder allows people to put their belongings and goods on top of the bus. The bus became a rural solution to the need of moving both cargo and passengers simultaneously. The most particular and substantial feature of this buses is the combination of wood and metal. However, the aesthetic interpretation given through the years to this buses became the most cultural trademark of rural Colombia in the early 20th century. This aesthetic approach to a tool that became of utmost importance to the peasants developed naturally and some of them have as of today evolved into actual pieces of art.

Symbol of Colombia and controversy

Chivas are recognized nationally and internationally as a symbol of Colombian culture, in particular of rural Colombia. On the other hand, they have been controversial and a subject of criticism. The main reason is that chivas, rather than being a symbol of Colombia's diverse urban and rural culture, are instead a symbol of underdevelopment and of the rustic hacking of a machine intended to be used in urban areas.

Today

The "Jeepao" is a similar version of the chiva, but in a Willies Jeep.

Other locales

The unique buses be found in South America but also in other locales, including the United States. As the population of Colombian Americans and Ecuadorian Americans has risen in New York City; so has the use of the customized bus. Developed into party buses equipped with their own bar, these can often be found carrying partygoers around the city. Drew Barrymore, Lucy Liu, and Cameron Diaz arrived in a Chiva for the New York premiere of Charlie's Angels. The party buses are also used in Panama with the term Chiva Parrandera.

Chivas are very similar to the concept of a tap tap in Haiti.

See also

Customised buses
Dekotora
Jingle truck

References

External links

Customised buses
Buses by type
Tourism in Colombia
Transport in Colombia
Transport in Ecuador
Decorated vehicles